Mount Upton is a hamlet on the Unadilla River in the town of Guilford in Chenango County, New York, United States.

Notable people
 E. J. Richmond (1825-1918), author

Hamlets in New York (state)
Hamlets in Chenango County, New York